The Journal of Engineering Tribology, Part J of the Proceedings of the Institution of Mechanical Engineers (IMechE), is a peer-reviewed academic journal that publishes research on engineering science associated with tribology and its applications. The journal was first published in 1994 and is published by SAGE Publications on behalf of IMechE.

Abstracting and indexing 
The Journal of Engineering Tribology is abstracted and indexed in Scopus and the Science Citation Index. According to the Journal Citation Reports, its 2013 impact factor is 0.631, ranking it 81st out of 126 journals in the category "Engineering, Mechanical".

References

External links 
 

Engineering journals
English-language journals
Institution of Mechanical Engineers academic journals
Monthly journals
Publications established in 1994
SAGE Publishing academic journals
Tribology